A number of United States Supreme Court opinions have been important for their development of the doctrine of legal standing in the context of federal law in the United States. Some of those opinions include:

References

Standing
United States standing case law